KTVU (channel 2) is a television station licensed to Oakland, California, United States, serving as the San Francisco Bay Area's Fox network outlet. It is owned and operated by the network's Fox Television Stations division alongside San Jose–licensed independent outlet KICU-TV (channel 36). Both stations share studios at Jack London Square in Oakland, while KTVU's transmitter is located atop Sutro Tower in San Francisco.

History

As an independent station
The station first signed on the air on March 3, 1958, originally operating as an independent station. The station was originally owned by San Francisco–Oakland Television, Inc., a local firm whose principals were William D. Pabst and Ward D. Ingrim, former executives at the Don Lee Network and KFRC radio; and Edwin W. Pauley, a Bay Area businessman who had led a separate group which competed against Pabst and Ingrim for the station's construction permit. KTVU's operations were inaugurated with a special live telecast from its temporary studio facility at the former Paris Theatre in downtown Oakland. That June, the station moved into a permanent facility at Jack London Square in western Oakland, which was constructed using material gathered by the Port of Oakland and repurposed from a demolished pier.

Channel 2 was the fourth commercial television station to sign on in the Bay Area, and the first independent station in the market. It was the second television outlet in Northern California to have been assigned the KTVU call letters, which were previously used by a short-lived station on UHF channel 36 in Stockton, which operated from December 1953 to April 30, 1955. During its first 15 years on the air, KTVU's transmitter facilities were originally based on a tower on San Bruno Mountain in northern San Mateo County. KTVU moved its transmitter facilities to the Sutro Tower after the structure was completed in 1973.

The Ingrim–Pabst–Pauley group attempted to sell KTVU to NBC in 1960, as the network sought to acquire a television station in the Bay Area to operate alongside KNBC radio (now KNBR). The sale was eventually canceled in October 1961, due to pre-existing concerns over the sale cited by the Federal Communications Commission (FCC) that were related to NBC's ownership of radio and television stations in Philadelphia; as a result, the NBC affiliation in San Francisco stayed with KRON-TV (channel 4, now a MyNetworkTV affiliate) until 2001, when NBC attempted again, successfully purchasing KNTV (channel 11). Eighteen months after the sale to NBC was aborted, in July 1963 channel 2 was sold to the Miami Valley Broadcasting Company, a precursor to the broadcasting division of Atlanta-based Cox Enterprises, for $12.3 million; the sale was finalized in mid-October of that year. Over the station's history as an independent, KTVU's programming schedule consisted mainly of syndicated off-network series, movies, talk shows and religious programs, as well as a sizeable amount of locally produced news, sports, talk and public affairs programming. In 1960, after acquiring camera, projection and slide equipment to transmit programming available in the format, the station began broadcasting its programming in color; much of the programs that it broadcast in color consisted of movies and certain series acquired from the syndication market that were produced in the format, as well as locally produced specials.

Under Cox's stewardship, channel 2 became the leading independent station in the San Francisco–Oakland market and one of the top-rated independents in the Western United States. KTVU retained this status even as competing independents on the UHF band signed on during the late 1960s, most notably KBHK-TV (channel 44, now KBCW) and KEMO-TV (channel 20, now KOFY-TV) within months of each other in early 1968.

In the early 1960s, KTVU obtained the local broadcast rights to the Warner Bros. Pictures library; the films it broadcast from the studio primarily consisted of those released during the 1950s, most being presented in color, which aired at 7:00 p.m. on Sundays. Channel 2 was the first television station in the Bay Area to air such films as A Star Is Born, East of Eden and Rebel Without a Cause. KTVU exercised discretion and limited the number of commercial break interruptions during the movie telecasts, often airing the films uncensored and with commentary, either by a studio host or via slides. The station even televised the Metro-Goldwyn-Mayer film Hollywood Revue of 1929 with some of the original two-strip Technicolor sequences. During the early 1970s, the station began employing a different programming strategy to stand out from the other independents in the market, acquiring first-run syndicated sitcoms and drama series, several comedies and dramas from the United Kingdom (such as Upstairs, Downstairs and The Benny Hill Show, the latter of which had some episodes re-edited by the station to remove scenes of frontal nudity accidentally left in the broadcast prints), and various nature series (including National Geographic specials) as alternative offerings.

As an independent competitor, KTVU aired a nightly film showcase, The 8 O'Clock Movie, as an alternative to network programs that aired during prime time on then-NBC affiliate KRON-TV, CBS station KPIX (channel 5) and ABC-owned KGO-TV (channel 7). Continuing into its early years as a Fox affiliate, KTVU frequently aired classic movies (around 20 per week) in the 8:00 p.m. time slot as well as on Sunday afternoons. Many of the films presented were prints restored by the station's editing department to eliminate color and splicing errors and scratches present within the negatives. It also occasionally aired movies originally assigned an R rating for their theatrical release (such as One Flew Over the Cuckoo's Nest and Walkabout) without editing for strong profanity, nudity or violence, some of which aired during prime time. In 1992, KTVU ran a station-edited version of the 1984 science fiction film Dune, which combined footage from the Alan Smithee television cut with the original theatrical release (thereby restoring all the violence featured in the latter cut, while eliminating some of the objectionable edits that caused director David Lynch to remove his name from the credits of the television print). KTVU also carried programming from the Operation Prime Time programming service (at least) in 1978.

Channel 2 adapted to competition over the years by reinventing the station's image with the launch of a promotional campaign using the slogan, "There's Only One 2" – which was used in its marketing and on-air promos, including a musical jingle, during the 1970s and 1980s (the slogan was reintroduced under Fox ownership in 2015).

In 1977, KTVU was uplinked to satellite as a national superstation, being carried primarily on systems operated by cable television provider and corporate cousin, Cox Cable. However, the station was unable to compete with WTBS (now WPCH-TV) in Atlanta, and two other independent stations that were uplinked to satellite as superstations in the two years after KTVU gained national distribution, WGN-TV in Chicago and WOR-TV (now co-owned MyNetworkTV owned-and-operated station WWOR-TV) in New York City, and began to scale down its national coverage via cable in 1982. While KTVU remained a superstation for the remainder of its run as an independent, its cable coverage would become limited to providers within the Western United States—primarily those located in Northern California, Nevada, Oregon and select areas of Utah. The station continued to be distributed nationally, however, on direct broadcast satellite via C-Band systems until the late 1990s; KTVU was also carried on PrimeStar as its Fox network feed for the Pacific Time Zone until the satellite provider merged with DirecTV in 1999.

Fox affiliation
In October 1985, News Corporation—which had purchased a 50% interest in 20th Century Fox corporate parent TCF Holdings for $250 million in March 1985, and also acquired John Kluge's Metromedia family of independent television stations in May 1985—announced its intentions to create a fourth television network that would use the resources of 20th Century Fox Television to both produce and distribute programming (with the Metromedia stations as the new network's flagships), intending to compete with ABC, CBS and NBC. The company formally announced the launch of the new network, the Fox Broadcasting Company, on May 7, 1986. Subsequently, Fox approached Cox Enterprises to affiliate with the upstart network months prior to its formal launch, with KTVU agreeing to serve as its charter affiliate for the San Francisco–Oakland–San Jose market. Channel 2's affiliation with Fox could be seen as a major coup for the fledgling network, because of its distinction as the highest-rated independent station in the Bay Area as well as one of the strongest independents in the U.S. It was also one of the few independents to affiliate with the network which broadcast on the VHF band and had an established local news identity.

KTVU and Cox's other two independent stations, WKBD-TV in Detroit and KDNL-TV in St. Louis, officially joined Fox seven months later on October 9, 1986, when the fledgling network inaugurated programming that day with the debut of the late night talk show The Late Show Starring Joan Rivers, which was also their only program in their first months of operation. Similar to other Fox stations during the network's early years, KTVU was programmed as a de facto independent station, even after Fox expanded its programming into prime time on weekend evenings in April 1987. Until Fox completed the expansion of its primetime schedule (which began with the launch of a Saturday night lineup in July 1987, and was gradually rolled out to additional nights over the next seven years) and began offering programming on all seven nights of the week in September 1993, KTVU continued to air a movie at 8:00 p.m. on nights when the network did not offer any programming. However, the station also decreased its reliance on movies during this period, due to the growing difficulty of broadcast stations in acquiring film content as the number of cable television networks increased. The strong ratings that KTVU had as an independent station carried over into its tenure with Fox, turning it into one of the network's strongest affiliates; despite having its programming occasionally being preempted by San Francisco Giants game telecasts, Fox was very satisfied with KTVU because of its ratings performance.

During the early and mid-1990s, the station gradually shifted the focus of its daytime schedule from a mix of off-network sitcoms and drama series to a lineup predominately made up of first-run syndicated talk, court and reality shows; it also continued to run some off-network sitcoms during the evening and late-night hours. Also, Channel 2 began to air an afternoon cartoon block supplied by the network, Fox Kids, when the Monday through Saturday children's lineup debuted in September 1990. The station continued to run Fox Kids programming on weekdays—moving it to an earlier time period on weekday afternoons in January 2000, to build an adult-targeted audience for the pending launch of its 6:00 p.m. newscast by filling the 4:00 to 6:00 p.m. slot with talk and court shows—until the network discontinued its afternoon block in January 2002; it retained the Saturday morning lineup, which eventually became known as 4Kids TV under a programming agreement with 4Kids Entertainment, until Fox discontinued its children's programming altogether on December 27, 2008 (replacing it with the two-hour infomercial block Weekend Marketplace).

Throughout its affiliation with Fox under Cox Enterprises ownership, the station continued to brand itself as "Channel 2", even as the network began to require that its owned-and-operated stations and affiliates incorporate the "Fox" name within their on-air branding. However, KTVU would begin to alternately brand as "Fox Channel 2" by the early 1990s, which was mainly used within promotions for Fox network programs, with the network's logo being placed to the left of KTVU's longtime "Circle Laser 2" logo (which was first introduced in 1975). In April 1997, the Fox wordmark logo was added onto the underside of the top line of "Circle Laser 2"; the station also concurrently changed its branding to "KTVU Fox 2" as the network tightened its branding standardizations for its stations—although the previous "KTVU Channel 2" moniker remained in use as part of its newscast branding (the "Fox 2" logo was also used on its newscasts in April 1997, but the moniker was used from March to October 2001).

On November 29, 1999, Cox Enterprises acquired San Jose-based independent station KICU-TV from Detroit businessman and Buffalo Bills owner Ralph Wilson and KICU president/general manager Jim Evers. The resulting pairing of KICU with KTVU created the Bay Area's first television station duopoly when the deal was finalized in March 2000; the operations of KICU migrated from that station's original studio facilities in San Jose, where KTVU relocated its South Bay news bureau, and were consolidated into KTVU's Jack London Square facility in Oakland. On March 3, 2008, KTVU celebrated its 50th anniversary of broadcasting. In honor of the anniversary, a series of fifteen promos were produced, which included those honoring past KTVU programs such as Romper Room and Captain Satellite as well as the station's sports programming.

Acquisition by Fox Television Stations
Following its purchase of WJZY in Charlotte, North Carolina, in March 2013, Variety reported that Fox Television Stations was pursuing station acquisitions in San Francisco and Seattle as it desired to have a larger presence in the markets of NFL teams that are part of the National Football Conference (such as the San Francisco 49ers and Seattle Seahawks), the conference to which Fox holds broadcast rights. Fox had for many years wanted to have an owned-and-operated station in the San Francisco Bay Area, which has always been one of the ten largest Nielsen television markets. After Fox Television Stations assumed ownership of charter affiliate WTXF-TV in Philadelphia in 1995, KTVU became the largest Fox station by market size not to be owned by the network. Fox's original parent company News Corporation (which spun off the network to 21st Century Fox in July 2013 as part of the company's separation of its entertainment and publishing assets) made several offers to buy KTVU, but Cox turned down each of News Corporation's proposals (Fox had also reportedly considered purchasing KIRO-TV, the CBS affiliate in Seattle, which would have displaced that market's charter Fox affiliate, KCPQ; such a purchase never materialized, although Fox did attempt to buy KCPQ outright before renewing its affiliation contract with that station in July 2014, after it was unsuccessful in pressuring Tribune Broadcasting to sell KCPQ by purchasing and proposing to move its programming to Bellingham, Washington-based KBCB).

On June 24, 2014, Fox announced that it would trade two of its owned-and-operated stations, WFXT in Boston and WHBQ-TV in Memphis, to the Cox Media Group in exchange for acquiring KTVU and KICU. The deal made KTVU the last Big Four network station in the Bay Area to become an owned-and-operated station of its associated network. Prior to this announcement it was rumored that Fox had considered buying rival (and former NBC affiliate) KRON-TV and moving its programming there (which would have resulted in KTVU losing its Fox affiliation to channel 4 had Fox acquired that station instead). The trade was completed on October 8, 2014, marking Channel 2's first ownership change in 51 years; the trade with Fox Television Stations also resulted in WFXT supplanting KTVU as Cox's largest television station by market size. As part of the trade, Cox Media Group and Fox Television Stations also reassigned key management personnel between the two markets; KTVU-KICU general manager Tom Raponi was reassigned to serve in the same position at WFXT, while Gregg Kelley was reassigned from WFXT to become vice president and general manager of the KTVU-KICU duopoly.

In November 2014, KTVU transitioned from Cox's in-house digital platforms to those operated by Fox, which included the release of new mobile apps and the transition of its website to the WorldNow platform and the webpage layouts that the provider designed for the Fox-owned stations. On February 8, 2015, KTVU began to fully comply with Fox's station branding guidelines, extending the "KTVU Fox 2" brand to its news programming (as well as adopting Fox Television Stations' standardized graphics package for the group's Fox O&Os); however, the station retained the "Circle Laser 2" logo by both including it within the group's standardized "boxkite" logo and in an alternate version in which it is now placed next to the Fox wordmark (the latter became the main logo in August 2015, when KTVU introduced updated introductions for its newscasts, which de-emphasized the standardized graphics).

On December 14, 2017, The Walt Disney Company, owner of ABC and KGO-TV, announced its intent to buy KTVU's parent company, 21st Century Fox, for $52.4 billion; the sale excluded the Fox Television Stations unit (including KTVU and KICU), the Fox network, Fox News, Fox Sports 1 and the MyNetworkTV programming service, which were transferred to a separate company.

Programming

Syndicated programs broadcast by KTVU include Sherri, The Jennifer Hudson Show, Pictionary, TMZ on TV, You Bet Your Life with Jay Leno, Extra, and TMZ Live.
Since it first joined the network as an affiliate in October 1986, KTVU has generally aired the entire Fox program lineup without preemptions (except for San Francisco Giants baseball games during its contractual tenure with the team), as the network airs fewer hours of programming than that offered by CBS, NBC and ABC. The only regular exception has been Fox NFL Kickoff, which KTVU has declined carriage of since the Sunday pre-game show and Fox NFL Sunday lead-in moved to Fox from Fox Sports 1 in September 2015, due to its existing commitment to carry the "official" San Francisco 49ers pregame show 49ers Pre Game Live on Sunday mornings during the NFL regular season; Kickoff thus airs at the same time on KICU.

At first, KTVU delayed the preempted prime time programming to weekends, but with the growth of Fox and because of viewer demand, the station eventually aired network shows that were delayed from their designated prime time slots following its 10:00 p.m. newscast. From the time that Cox took over the operations of KICU in 2000 until Channel 2 lost the Giants rights after the 2007 season, the preempted Fox programming would be moved to KICU to air in their network-designated time slots.

Locally produced programming
From 1958 until the early 1970s, KTVU aired the space-themed afternoon children's program Captain Satellite, which was hosted by Bob March and was set in a fictional spaceship known as the Starfinder II. The series—which was originally produced at Moose Hall in Oakland, before moving to the KTVU studios in 1959—showcased cartoons between segments (including among others The Space Explorers), as well as film clips provided by the National Aeronautics and Space Administration (NASA) and live in-studio visits from astronauts.

Until the 1980s, the station produced a series of classic public service shorts titled Bits and Pieces, often featuring two talking puppets, Charley and Humphrey, which Pat McCormick had brought over to KTVU from his tenure at KGO-TV. The shorts, which often aired during children's programs shown on the station, were aimed at delivering positive and educational messages to kids. In the late 1970s, Charley and Humphrey were spun off into a daily children's program on KTVU, which was hosted by McCormick. Channel 2 also served as the Bay Area's originating station for the children's television program franchise Romper Room; originally hosted by Nancy Besst, the half-hour program aired at 8:30 a.m. on weekday mornings for much of the 1980s.

One of the station's most successful programs—both in terms of ratings and cultural impact—was Creature Features, a Saturday prime time showcase of horror movies that was originally hosted by Bob Wilkins, who had earlier hosted a popular and similarly themed show at KCRA-TV in Sacramento. Wilkins brought a straight presentation and dry wit to a television genre made ridiculous by the likes of Vampira. Creature Features became an immediate hit following its January 9, 1971, premiere telecast, eventually expanding to a double feature format in the mid-1970s, by which time it was defeating network fare such as Saturday Night Live (on KRON-TV) in the local ratings. It was these latter ratings victories that resulted in John Belushi and John Landis appearing on the program in 1978, during their promotional tour for National Lampoon's Animal House. Wilkins also interviewed then-local author Anne Rice upon the publication of Interview with the Vampire as well as, among many others, Christopher Lee, William Shatner and local independent filmmaker Ernie Fosselius (of Hardware Wars fame).

Wilkins eventually began hosting a second program on KTVU, Captain Cosmic, donning a silver motorcycle helmet and crimson cape in his portrayal of the title character. It was wherein the program that he introduced the Bay Area—and by extension, through KTVU's superstation status, the rest of the country—to Japanese anime by broadcasting such shows as Star Blazers and Ultra Man. Captain Cosmic was a hit, though it ended when Wilkins retired from television in 1979; former San Francisco Chronicle reporter and occasional co-host John Stanley took over as sole host of Creature Features from 1979 until its cancellation in 1982.

Other local programs that aired on KTVU during its run as an independent station included the film showcase/trivia game show franchise Dialing for Dollars, which was first hosted by Mel Venter and later by Pat McCormick, who later served as a weather anchor at the station; National All-Star Wrestling, which aired on Friday nights during the early and mid-1960s from the KTVU studios or Daly City's Cow Palace and was hosted by Walt Harris; and Roller Derby, which Harris also hosted for many years and featured San Francisco Bay Bombers roller derby games until the demise of the International Roller Derby League in 1973. During the early 2000s, KTVU broadcast San Francisco's Chinese New Year Parade each winter; sister station KICU generally rebroadcast the parade on the evening of its broadcast (independent station KTSF, channel 26, aired its own Chinese-language telecast of the parade using "pool" cameras).

Sports programming
KTVU obtained the rights to televise San Francisco Giants Major League Baseball games in 1961, three years after the team relocated to the Bay Area from New York City. After the move, the Giants initially opted against televising their games to encourage game attendance by Bay Area residents and tourists. When channel 2 became the Giants' television partner, it was only permitted to televise the team's road games against the Los Angeles Dodgers until 1965, when the station began airing additional regular season and exhibition games (KTVU's relationship with the Giants extended to the franchise's ownership, as Cox Enterprises owned a 10% stake in the Giants during the latter years of the broadcast contract). KTVU eventually began sharing the local television rights to the Giants with SportsChannel Bay Area (now NBC Sports Bay Area, in which the Giants had purchased a 30% minority interest in December 2007) when the regional sports network launched in July 1991.

Channel 2 lost the local over-the-air telecast rights to the Giants following the 2007 season when the broadcast television contract was taken over by San Jose–based NBC owned-and-operated station KNTV. The Giants continue to maintain a presence on Channel 2 to the present day, as some Saturday afternoon—and more recently, Saturday evening—regular-season games (in addition to the team's postseason and World Series appearances which included the team's victories in 2010, 2012, and 2014) have been carried on the station since 1996, through Fox's national broadcast contract with Major League Baseball. KTVU also carried games of the cross-bay rival Oakland Athletics during that team's world championship season in 1973, and also airs Athletics games that are part of the Fox MLB broadcast contract.

KTVU has also served as the market's primary official television broadcaster of the San Francisco 49ers since 1994, when Fox assumed the contractual rights to air games from the National Football Conference (NFC). The station airs most of the team's regular-season and playoff games that do not have rights held by other broadcast networks (primarily those involving the 49ers' in-conference opponents), as well as another 49ers-related programming during the NFL season including the pre-game show 49ers Pre Game Live (on Sunday mornings), the weekly station-produced sports program KTVU Mercedes-Benz Sports Weekend (on Saturday evenings), magazine program 49ers Total Access (which follows Sports Wrap on Sunday evenings) and the 49ers Red & Gold Specials (comprising four programs focusing on the 49ers' history that air on either KTVU or KICU during the team's training camp and/or preseason). The station aired the team's appearance in Super Bowl LIV.

KTVU also airs most Las Vegas Raiders games (a holdover from when the team played in Oakland) in which the team plays host to an NFC team at Allegiant Stadium and starting in 2014, when the NFL instituted its new 'cross-flex' broadcast rules, any Raiders game involving another AFC team that is moved from KPIX to KTVU. The San Francisco/Golden State Warriors also aired many of their basketball games on KTVU on several occasions through the years, first from 1962 to 1963, and later from 1965 to 1968, 1969 to 1983 and the late 1990s to 2001.

News operation

, KTVU presently broadcasts 67 hours of locally produced newscasts each week (with 11½ hours on weekdays, 4½ hours on Saturdays and five hours on Sundays); in regards to the number of hours devoted to news programming, it has the second-highest newscast output of any television station in the San Francisco Bay Area (behind MyNetworkTV affiliate KRON-TV, which carries 72 hours each week), and one of the top 4 in the country. In addition, the station produces the sports highlight program Sports Wrap, which airs Saturdays at 10:45 p.m. and Sundays at 11:30 p.m. (it originally existed as a 15-minute program contained within the weekend editions of the 10:00 p.m. newscast until May 30, 2015, after which the Sunday edition was spun-off into a separate half-hour program on June 7; the program retains its 15-minute format for its Saturday edition), and the public affairs program Bay Area People, which airs Saturdays at 6:30 a.m. The Saturday and Sunday editions of KTVU's 6:00 p.m. newscast is subject to preemption or delay due to network sports telecasts overrunning into or starting within either time slot; since April 2016, sister station KICU has served as an alternate broadcaster of KTVU newscasts that are preempted by network sports telecasts. KTVU was the fifth-largest Fox station overall without a newscast in a conventional late news time slot (locally in the San Francisco market, 11:00 p.m. Pacific Time). As of 2021, KTVU airs a newscast at 11:00 p.m.

The station has been well known in the Bay Area for its news programming; KTVU's news department began operations along with the station on March 3, 1958, with the launch of The 10 o'clock News (modified to a fully spelled titling in 2001, before switching to partially numerical-based titling—as the Fox 2 10:00 News, mirroring similar titling schemes for newscasts used by some of its sister stations such as Los Angeles O&O KTTV—for six months starting in February 2015 under Fox ownership, before reverting to the previous title form), which for years had been the market's only local television newscast at 10:00 p.m. Initially airing for a half-hour on Monday through Friday nights, the program was originally anchored by Les Nichols (who served as KTVU's managing editor) and Al Helmso (who also served as the station's first news director). The program has long established itself with top-drawer talent, many of whom have worked at KTVU for more than ten years. Though, early on, the program experienced turnover with its main anchor team. Nichols and Helmso stepped down as main anchors in the early 1960s, replaced by Gary Park and Stan Atkinson. The program was reformatted in 1971 as The Tuck-Fortner Report, with Ron Fortner and Michael Tuck at the helm; they were replaced by Marcia Brandwynne and George Reading in 1974 (Reading would later be replaced by Atkinson and eventually, Judd Hambrick). The weeknight editions of The 10 o'clock News would expand to one hour in 1975; hour-long weekend editions were eventually added in September 1979, which were first by anchored by Elaine Corral.

In 1976, assignment reporter Dennis Richmond was appointed as the station's lead anchor and became known among local viewers for his straightforward and interpersonal, but calm and unopinionated delivery in his reporting. Richmond's co-anchors throughout his tenure were Judd Hambrick (1976–1977), Andy Park (1977–1978), Barbara Simpson (1978–1986), Elaine Corral (1986–1998, abruptly resigning on-air in March 1998), Leslie Griffith (1998–2006) and finally Julie Haener, who became weeknight co-anchor in May 2007 and remains in that capacity . Richmond anchored The Ten O'Clock News for 32 of his 40 years at KTVU until his retirement in May 2008. Replacing him was Frank Somerville, who, starting in 1992, had handled morning and noon anchor duties, before moving to the 5:00 p.m. newscast in 2005 and eventually joining Haener as lead anchor. Another mainstay of KTVU's prime time newscast was Pat McCormick, who served as a weather anchor off-and-on from 1969 until his retirement in 1995 (replacing Bob Wilkins as chief weathercaster in 1974); his successor Bill Martin, who joined Channel 2 in 1996, was the first television meteorologist in the Bay Area to provide six-day weather forecasts. Bob MacKenzie was also a fixture for many years as a feature reporter, and also did occasional topical commentary pieces, winning 13 Bay Area Emmy Awards during his tenure at the station from 1978 to 2006 (although MacKenzie would continue to file occasional reports following his formal retirement from KTVU until 2010).

For more than 40 years, The Ten O'Clock News has been the ratings leader in the San Francisco Bay Area at 10:00 p.m., with or without news competition in the arena. The program's rise to ratings dominance—even at times when weaker-rated shows led into the newscast—occurred under the helm of longtime news director Fred Zehnder (who originally joined the station as an assistant news director, before being promoted to head the news department after the firing of his predecessor Ted Kavanau in 1978). Zehnder crafted a no-nonsense journalistic style for The 10 o'clock News that was based around in-depth and fair reporting, largely devoid of the "happy talk" banter among anchors that was common of other local television newscasts. During Zehnder's tenure, KTVU became one of the most respected local television news operations in the United States and earned several journalism awards over the next two decades, including Emmy, Associated Press, Peabody and duPont-Columbia Awards.

The 10:00 p.m. newscast's dominance was to such an extent that, from 1987 to 2005, the program was referenced in its title sequence and some news promotions as "the #1 primetime newscast in the country", a factual statement based on the number of viewers watching the program at that hour, even beating network programs airing against it on KRON-TV, KGO-TV and KPIX on most nights. It was such a force to be reckoned with that when KRON and KPIX respectively timeshifted NBC and CBS' prime time lineups one hour earlier as part of the "early prime" network scheduling experiment in February 1992, The Ten O'Clock News handily beat the late evening newscasts that both stations had consequently moved up to 10:00. KRON would move its late news back to the 11:00 p.m. slot in September 1993; KPIX would not follow suit until September 1998 (although it would later begin producing a competing half-hour 10:00 newscast for KBCW in March 2008). In stark contrast, when KRON became an independent station in January 2002, it initially scheduled its new prime time newscast at 9:00 p.m. to avoid competing directly with KTVU (KRON would eventually restore a newscast at 10:00 p.m. on May 16, 2016). Moreover, WB affiliate KBWB (now KOFY-TV) canceled its KNTV-produced 10:00 p.m. newscast after four years in 2002, as it was unable to compete with KTVU in the ratings. During this period, KTVU branded its flagship newscast as The Original Ten O'Clock News.

The Ten O'Clock News is also one of the few local newscasts in the United States to have been syndicated to other television stations. , the program also airs on Fox affiliate KCBA in Monterey (which also carries the weekday editions of Mornings on 2), MyNetworkTV affiliates KRVU-LD in Chico and KEMY-LP in Eureka, California, and Fox affiliate KRXI-TV in Reno, Nevada (the latter of which was co-owned with KTVU under Cox Enterprises from 1997 to 2013, and had also carried KTVU's morning and noon newscasts until Cox discontinued its agreement with KRXI owner Sinclair Broadcast Group to air both programs on May 14, 2014).

Throughout its run as an independent station, The Ten O'Clock News was the only news program on KTVU. The station first began programming news outside its established 10:00 p.m. slot in September 1986, when it debuted 2 at Noon. Originally anchored by Barbara Simpson and Bob MacKenzie, the hour-long midday news-talk program—which replaced syndicated game shows in the noontime slot—featured a hybrid of in-depth interviews and various lifestyle features, preceded by a news summary during the first half-hour. The program was reformatted into a more traditional newscast in 1990, as The Noon News, at which time it was shortened to a half-hour (the newscast would eventually revert to an hour on April 7, 2016). In September 1989, the station debuted a half-hour 6:00 p.m. newscast, The 6:00 News, which lasted until its cancellation in 1991.

Channel 2 eventually decided to shift towards a news-intensive format to compete with KRON, KPIX, KGO-TV and KNTV that took the course of several years to take effect; Fox has never carried any national network newscasts (aside from news updates produced out of its New York City station WNYW that aired during prime time from 1987 to 1990, and four attempts at newsmagazines between 1987 and 2003), but it still motivated its affiliates, including KTVU, to air more local news programming. The station's original morning newscast, Mornings on 2, debuted on January 2, 1991 as a two-hour broadcast from 7:00 to 9:00 a.m., replacing animated series in the time period (the program would expand to three hours on September 14, 2015); as such, it became the fourth Fox station to air a newscast on weekday mornings. This was followed on August 5, 1996, by the debut of an additional hour-long newscast at 6:00 a.m. (which would gradually expand to three hours, now beginning at 4:00 a.m.). Early evening newscasts later returned on March 27, 2000 with the debut of a new half-hour 6:00 p.m. newscast (which expanded to an hour on April 25, 2016), followed in April 2005 by the addition of an hour-long 5:00 p.m. newscast on weekdays (an expansion of an existing weekend-only newscast that debuted in 1998).

Besides beating out its competition in the 10:00 p.m. time slot, The Ten O'Clock News has also placed ahead of KRON, KPIX and KGO's 11:00 p.m. newscasts in overall late news viewership for much of its history; however as its news programming expanded, KTVU's newscasts avidly competed for first overall with KRON-TV and KGO-TV during the 1990s. Its newscasts became the highest-rated among the Bay Area's television stations in the early 2000s, firmly taking first place from KRON-TV following Channel 4's January 2002 disaffiliation from NBC. The May 1999 retirement of Zehnder brought changes to the newsroom; however, KTVU was ranked as the highest quality local newscast in the nation in 2000 by the Project for Excellence in Journalism under his immediate successor, Andrew Finlayson (who began his tenure at KTVU as a noon news producer in 1988 and left the station in 2003), while maintaining the top rating slot at 10:00 and throughout the noon and morning newscasts. Varying prime time numbers and improvements at competitors (as well as audience erosion for local programming in general) have since led to a decline in the once-dominant news operation's ratings, although it retains the #1 spot, a rarity for a Fox station. For August 2010, KTVU's newscasts ranked #1 among adult viewers 25–54, beating KPIX, KGO, KNTV, and KRON.

KTVU had used the "KTVU News Theme" by Michael Randall as the primary theme music for its newscasts from 1987 (debuting alongside a custom title sequence for the 10:00 p.m. newscast that was updated in 1994 and used until 2001, featuring a CGI fly-over of the Bay Area showcasing the program's title logo gliding across the waters of the San Francisco Bay) until the package was replaced on June 23, 2010, by a new 615 Music-composed theme called "Icon News". In the 2000s, Channel 2 became the last news-producing English language station in the Bay Area to begin utilizing a helicopter for newsgathering, with the introduction of News Chopper 2 (now known as SkyFox as part of the rebranding by Fox after its acquisition). On October 10, 2006, KTVU became the first television station in the Bay Area to begin broadcasting its local newscasts in high definition; with the upgrade, the station debuted a new state-of-the-art studio designed for HD newscast production, which replaced the previous set that had been in use since 1986 (with updates in 1989, 1997 and 2005); video from remote and field equipment was initially broadcast in 480p standard definition following the transition; high definition cameras are now utilized for field reports. This change followed its former sister stations, WSB-TV in Atlanta and WFTV in Orlando, which also began airing their newscasts in high definition.

On January 21, 2008, the station began producing a half-hour newscast at 7:00 p.m. each weeknight for sister station KICU-TV. In 2010, the KTVU news department was honored with a Peabody Award for its coverage of the June 2009 shooting of unarmed African-American male Oscar Grant in a Bay Area Rapid Transit (BART) terminal. On January 22, 2011, KTVU launched two-hour newscasts on Saturdays and Sundays from 7:00 to 9:00 a.m., becoming the largest Fox affiliate and the second-largest Fox station – behind the network's Dallas O&O KDFW – to carry newscasts on weekend mornings (the program later expanded to three hours until 10:00 a.m. in January 2014). Two days later on January 24, 2011, KTVU expanded its weekday morning newscast to 4½ hours, with the addition of a half-hour at 4:30 a.m.

In March 2014, KTVU began using the AFD #10 broadcast flag to present its newscasts in letterboxed widescreen for viewers watching on cable through 4:3 television sets (the AFD #10 flag had already been used to show Fox programming on the station in the letterbox format on Bay Area cable and IPTV providers). In February 2015, KTVU introduced a new graphics package, accompanied by the replacement of the "Icon News" package with OSI Music's "Fox Affiliate News Theme", matching with the imaging style of other Fox Television Stations-owned outlets and implementing the "Fox 2" brand universally. On June 22, 2015 (originally announced in an April 14 release that also announced the expansion of Mornings on 2 by a half-hour earlier at 4:00 a.m. on April 20), KTVU debuted an hour-long 4:00 p.m. newscast, marking the first time that a Fox owned-and-operated station would air a newscast during that hour since a short-lived 4:30 p.m. effort on former Boston O&O WFXT in 2002 that lasted for one year (all but two of Fox's other O&Os start their early-evening news blocks at 5:00 p.m.).

Controversies

2013 Asiana Airlines graphic

During the July 12, 2013, noon newscast, anchor Tori Campbell read a news release that claimed to identify the four pilots of Asiana Airlines Flight 214, which crash landed at San Francisco International Airport on July 6. A summer intern at the National Transportation Safety Board (NTSB) had incorrectly confirmed the spellings of the satirical names to a KTVU staffer who called to verify the release. The names read were: Captain Sum Ting Wong ("something['s] wrong"), Wi Tu Lo ("we [are] too low", referring to the plane's altitude), Ho Lee Fuk ("holy fuck", but pronounced by Campbell as ) and Bang Ding Ow (onomatopoeia for hitting the ground and exclamations of pain).

The NTSB apologized for its role in the incident, stating in a press release that "appropriate actions will be taken to ensure that such a serious error is not repeated." Several KTVU staff were terminated immediately, and a news producer, Elvin Sledge, left, reportedly for health reasons.

Asiana Airlines announced on July 15, 2013, that it would file a defamation lawsuit against KTVU, claiming the incident damaged the airline's reputation, but withdrew it a few days later, stating that it would instead "concentrate all [their] efforts on dealing with the aftermath of the accident." KTVU filed requests through the Digital Millennium Copyright Act to remove user-uploaded videos of the prank, causing some criticism for "trying to cover up their mistake." The station contended that the takedowns were intended to lessen insensitivity towards the Asian community.

2019 NLDS graphic
The station received complaints after the 6 p.m. newscast on October 9, 2019, featured a headline about the Atlanta Braves being "scalped" when losing the deciding Game 5 of the National League Division Series to the St. Louis Cardinals, 13–1. Viewers who took to social media to express their disapproval stated the station used language considered to be insensitive to the Native American culture. KTVU issued a statement the following day regretting the incident.

Frank Somerville suspension
Local media reported that anchor Frank Somerville was placed on indefinite suspension after editors overruled his request to add commentary to a September 21, 2021, report on the Gabrielle Petito missing-person investigation. According to the reporting, Somerville's commentary tag would have alluded to "missing white woman syndrome."

Paul Pelosi underwear rumor
In October 2022, following the attack on Paul Pelosi, KTVU inaccurately reported that the attacker was in his underwear at the time of the incident. The station subsequently retracted this claim and removed mention of the underwear from the relevant article; however, social media users and conservative public figures including Dinesh D'Souza began repeating the underwear claim as if it was fact, as well as baselessly assuming that Pelosi was also in his underwear as well.

Notable former on-air staff

 Brian Copeland – morning feature reporter/meteorologist (1994–1999); later with KGO (AM)
 Mark Curtis – morning anchor/correspondent (1993–2007); now political analyst at WOWK-TV
 Priya David – reporter (2005–2008); now at KQED (TV)
 Ron Fortner – co-anchor of The Tuck and Fortner Report (early-1970s); deceased
 Leslie Griffith – evening anchor/reporter (1986–2006); former elephant activist; deceased
 Lloyd LaCuesta – South Bay bureau chief (1977–2012); now a professor at San Jose State University's School of Journalism & Mass Communications
 Pat McCormick – meteorologist, and host of Dialing for Dollars and children's show Charlie and Humphrey (1968–1995)
 Byron Miranda – meteorologist (2006); now at WPIX
 Steve Physioc – sports director (1987–1989); now works for the Kansas City Royals
 Sergio Quintana – reporter; now at KNTV
 Scott Reiss – weekend sports anchor (2014–2020); now sports commentator for Stanford University
 Dennis Richmond – evening anchor (1968–2008)
 Ted Rowlands – reporter (2001–2004), anchor (2016–2017); now at Court TV
 Ryan Seacrest – morning entertainment reporter (now host of Live with Kelly and Ryan, On Air with Ryan Seacrest, American Idol, and American Top 40, managing editor for E! News, and television producer)
 Don Sherwood – talk show host (1950s); deceased
 Sara Sidner – weekend anchor/reporter (2004–2007); now at CNN
 Barbara Simpson – anchor (1970s–80s); later at KSFO
 Frank Somerville – afternoon anchor (1992–2008); 5 p.m., 6 p.m., 10 p.m. and 11 p.m. anchor (2008–2021); formerly with KSTP-TV
 Michael Tuck – co-anchor of The Tuck and Fortner Report (1970–1974); later anchored in San Diego; deceased
 Charlie Van Dyke – station announcer (1987–1995)
 Thuy Vu – anchor/reporter (1998–2000); later at KQED
 Bob Wilkins – original host of Creature Features (1971–1979) and the children's show Captain Cosmic (1977–1979); deceased

Technical information

Subchannels
The station's digital signal is multiplexed:

 
KTVU also operates a Mobile DTV simulcast feed on subchannel 2.1. The feed was originally transmitted over the MDTV signal of sister station KICU-TV, but has since moved to a standalone signal.

KTVU originally launched a digital subchannel on virtual channel 2.2 in 2008, as an affiliate of the Spanish-language network LATV, which moved to a subchannel of KOFY-TV in 2019, and later KCNZ-CD in 2021. This subchannel later affiliated with Fox Weather in January 2022.

Translators

Analog-to-digital conversion
KTVU shut down its analog signal, over VHF channel 2, on June 12, 2009, as part of the federally mandated transition from analog to digital television. The station's digital signal was relocated from its pre-transition UHF channel 56, which was among the high band UHF channels (52–69) that were removed from broadcasting use as a result of the transition, to UHF channel 44 (the allocation previously occupied by KBCW's analog signal), using PSIP to display KTVU's virtual channel as 2 on digital television receivers.

KTVU also operates a digital fill-in translator on UHF channel 26, which serves the southern part of the viewing area, including San Jose.

References

External links

 
 KICU-TV website

1958 establishments in California
Mass media in Oakland, California
Fox Television Stations
Buzzr affiliates
Movies! affiliates
Television channels and stations established in 1958
TVU
Low-power television stations in the United States